Dorcadion ariannae is a species of beetle in the family Cerambycidae. It was described by Pesarini and Sabbadini in 2008. It is known from Greece.

References

ariannae
Beetles described in 2008